Al-Mansur ibn al-Nasir (died 1104) was the sixth ruler of the Hammadids in Algeria (1088–1104).

Biography 
Al-Mansur ibn al-Nasir succeeded his father Nasir ibn Alnas in 1088. In 1090, he left the Kal'a (Beni Hammad Fort), the traditional capital of the Hammadids, to settle in Béjaïa (Bougie) with his troops and his court, which he considered less accessible to the Nomads. He left the region because of the destruction caused by the arrival of the Banu Hilal. His father had already prepared this transfer by transforming a fishing port into a city he calls An-Nasiriya but which was to assume the name of Bougie, the name of a tribe that inhabited this region. Al-Mansur built public buildings, palaces, a water distribution network and gardens in Bejaia. The Hammadid kingdom thus abandoned its nomadic origins and became sedentary. The Kal'a was not completely abandoned by al-Mansur and he even embellished it with a number of palaces. The Hammadids therefore had two capitals joined by a royal road at this time.

References

Bibliography 
 
 

11th-century births
1104 deaths
Hammadids
11th-century rulers in Africa
12th-century rulers in Africa
11th-century Berber people
12th-century Berber people